The K-1 cart is a wire cart type K-1. It comprises a 2-wheel reel cart used for the rapid laying and recovering of telephone and telegraph lines in the field. It is completely equipped with a reel, mechanically rotated and controlled, 1 chest with wire-laying equipment, a driver's seat, and appropriate parts and fittings specially designed and used for only on this cart; designed to carry 5 miles of wire, type W-39. It was formerly known as "Wire reel cart, type N".

A rare sample of the Wire reel cart, type N can be found in the Signal Corps Museum at Fort Gordon, Georgia.

See also
List of Signal Corps Vehicles
K-2 Lance wagon
K-3 cart
K-4 cart
K-5 truck
K-8 cart

Notes
2) Electrical instruments and telephones of the US Signal Corps (1911)
3) Military Signal Corps manual (1918)

References

Carts